Pharsophorus is an extinct genus of borhyaenoid sparassodont that inhabited South America during the Middle to Late Oligocene epoch.

Taxonomy 
Originally, Pharsophorus was thought to be a borhyaenid, and was even considered to be the ancestor of Borhyaena, Acrocyon, and Arctodictis, but later phylogenetic analyses have shown that it is not a member of the Borhyaenidae and is only more distantly related to these forms. Remains of Pharsophorus are known from the Sarmiento Formation of the provinces of Mendoza, Santa Cruz, and Chubut in Argentina, as well as the Salla Formation at the fossil site of Salla in western Bolivia. The species "Pharsophorus" antiquus, formerly assigned to this genus, was eventually made the type species of a separate genus Australohyaena.

References 

Sparassodonts
Oligocene mammals of South America
Deseadan
Paleogene Argentina
Fossils of Argentina
Paleogene Bolivia
Fossils of Bolivia
Fossil taxa described in 1897
Taxa named by Florentino Ameghino
Prehistoric mammal genera
Sarmiento Formation